The Department of Pennsylvania represented the Union Army at the Battle of Hoke's Run (July 2, 1861) during the outset of the American Civil War. Although the entire force crossed the Potomac River into Virginia, the First and Sixth Brigades were primarily engaged.

Abbreviations used

Military rank
 MG = Major General
 BG = Brigadier General
 Col = Colonel
 Ltc = Lieutenant Colonel
 Maj = Major
 Cpt = Captain

Other
 w = wounded
 mw = mortally wounded
 k = killed
 c = captured

Department of Pennsylvania

MG Robert Patterson

References

American Civil War orders of battle